Zapis (trans. Inscription) is the sixth and latest studio album from Serbian and Yugoslav hard rock band Kerber, released in 1996.

Background and recording
Zapis was recorded after the hiatus in the band's work caused by the outbreak of the Yugoslav Wars. It was recorded from October to December 1995 in PGP-RTS Studio V and produced by Vladimir Negovanović. All the album lyrics were written by the band's old associate Duško Arsenijević, Zapis being Kerber's second album to feature all the lyrics written by him, the first one being the band's fourth studio album, Ljudi i bogovi (Humans and Gods). The album was recorded with three new members, bass guitarist Saša Vasković (who came in as the replacement for Branko Isaković), acoustic guitar player Vladan Stanojević and percussionist Goran Đorđević. For the first time in the band's career, the lineup included acoustic guitar and percussion, and instead of Božinović's trademark synthesizer sound, most of the songs featured him playing Hammond organ. Van Gogh frontman Zvonimir Đukić "Đule" made a guest appearance on the album, playing guitar. The album also featured guest appearances by bass guitarists Nenad Stefanović "Japanac", Slaviša Pavlović and the band's former member Branko Isaković. The album artwork was created by pop music singer Maja Nikolić.

Unlike Kerber's previous albums, Zapis was released on audio cassette only on its initial run. However, promotional LP records were sent to radio stations in late 1995, but, due to the limitations of the vinyl format, the tracks "Šta mogu pesme" ("What Songs Can Do") and "Pronađi mesto" ("Find a Place") were left off. Zapis was released on CD for the first time in 2009, as a part of the Sabrana dela (Collected Works) box set.

Track listing

Personnel
Goran Šepa – vocals
Tomislav Nikolić – guitar
Branislav Božinović – keyboard
Saša Vasković – bass guitar
Josip Hartl – drums
Vladimir Stanojević – acoustic guitar
Goran Đorđević – percussion

Additional personnel
Zvonimir Đukić - guitar
Branko Isaković - bass guitar
Nenad Stefanović - bass guitar
Slaviša Pavlović - bass guitar
Marina Popović - backing vocals
Vladimir Negovanović - producer, guitar
Goran Šimpraga - recorded by
Maja Nikolić - artwork
Dušan Mitić - photography

References

External links
 

Kerber albums
1996 albums
PGP-RTS albums